Shri Madhopur railway station is a railway station in Sikar district, Rajasthan. Its code is SMPR. It serves Shri Madhopur city. The station consists of two platforms. Passenger, Express and Superfast trains halt here.

Trains

The following trains halt at Shri Madhopur railway station in both directions:
 Rewari Phulera Express 
 Chetak Express
 Bandra Terminus–Delhi Sarai Rohilla Express
 Chandigarh–Bandra Terminus Superfast Express

References

Railway stations in Sikar district
Jaipur railway division